Leccinum aberrans is a species of bolete fungus in the family Boletaceae. Found in the United States, it was described as new to science in 1971 by American mycologists Alexander H. Smith and Harry Delbert Thiers.

References

Fungi described in 1971
Fungi of the United States
aberrans
Fungi without expected TNC conservation status